National Highway 132 is a national highway of India. It runs entirely in Tamil Nadu.

References

Route 

National highways in India